Piptostigma giganteum is a species of plant in the Annonaceae family. It is endemic to Nigeria.  It is threatened by habitat loss.

References

Flora of Nigeria
Annonaceae
Vulnerable plants
Endemic flora of Nigeria
Taxonomy articles created by Polbot